A stripper clip (also known as a charger or charger clip, especially in British and in Commonwealth military vocabulary) is a speedloader that holds several cartridges (usually between 5 and 10) together in a single unit for easier and faster loading of a firearm magazine. 

Stripper clips were originally employed in infantry bolt-action rifles, such as the Russian Mosin–Nagant, the British Lee–Enfield, and the German Mauser Model 1889, Gewehr 98 and its variant the Karabiner 98k, the related US M1903 Springfield, M1917, Swiss K31 and many others. Stripper clips were also employed in newer, semi-automatic rifles with internal box magazines, such as the Soviet SKS, and the Egyptian Hakim Rifle.

Stripper clips differ from en bloc clips in that they are not designed to be inserted into the weapon itself, but only to load it or its magazine. After the magazine is loaded, the stripper clip is removed and set aside for reloading, or simply discarded during combat. 

Generally, a weapon that can use a stripper clip for loading can also be loaded one round at a time, while a weapon designed for an en bloc clip cannot be used without the clip.

Currently, they are used to top off detachable box magazines for semi-automatic and automatic rifles. A magazine loader is placed on the lip of the box magazine, the clip is placed inside the loader, and then the rounds are pushed into the magazine.

Use 
It is called a "stripper" clip because, after the bolt is opened and the stripper clip is placed in position (generally by placing it in a slot on either the receiver or bolt), the user presses on the cartridges from above, sliding them into the magazine and stripping them off the clip. Stripper clips differ from en bloc clips in that they are not designed to be inserted into the weapon itself, but only to load it or its magazine. After the magazine is loaded, the stripper clip is removed and set aside for reloading, or simply discarded during combat. 

Generally, a weapon that can use a stripper clip for loading can also be loaded one round at a time, while a weapon designed for an en bloc clip cannot be used without the clip.

Depending on the firearm, magazine, and cartridge, stripper clips come in a variety of shapes, some quite complex, though most are either straight or crescent-shaped pieces of stamped metal—usually brass, steel (often blued or parkerized), or plastic.

History 

Stripper/charger clips have been used since 1889 (in the form of the Mauser Model 1889), while en bloc clips have been used since the mid to late 1880s. Stripper clips are intended purely to load ammunition into the magazine, while en bloc clips, as used in the M1 Garand as well as the Italian Carcano, are designed to be inserted into the magazine itself, essentially forming part of the loaded working magazine. 

The M1891 Three Line Rifle (the first "Mosin-Nagant") utilized stripper clips; however, the design was improved upon later and gradually refined by Mauser. Mauser clips are inherently smoother and are ejected automatically upon closing the bolt, while Mosin-Nagant clips require a special technique to get anywhere near the same efficiency and must be manually removed before the bolt can be closed. Still, both are faster than reloading with single cartridges. Moreover, once some but not all rounds have been fired, en bloc clip format guns are, as a rule, difficult or impossible to top-up to their maximum capacity again with additional cartridges, which is generally easy with stripper-clip loading weapons.

Stripper clips were originally employed in infantry bolt-action rifles, such as the Russian Mosin–Nagant, the British Lee–Enfield, and the German Gewehr 98 and its variant the Mauser K98k, the related US M1903 Springfield and many others. Stripper clips were also employed in newer, semi-automatic rifles with internal box magazines, such as the Soviet SKS and Egyptian Hakim Rifle. Many early semi-automatic pistols also used stripper clips to reload, including the Mannlicher M1894, the Roth–Steyr M1907, and the Mauser C96.

In modern use, strippers are used to fill detachable box magazines for semi-automatic and automatic rifles. A magazine loader is placed on the lip of the box magazine, a full clip is inserted in the loader and the rounds are pushed into the magazine.

See also 
Clip (firearms)
Magazine (firearms)

References

External links

 Stripper Clips

Ammunition
Firearm components